The 7th Grey Cup was played on November 20, 1915, before 2,808 fans at Varsity Stadium at Toronto to determine the championship of Canadian football.

The Hamilton Tigers defeated the Toronto Rowing and Athletic Association 13–7.

Notable facts
This was the last Grey Cup game before a World War I hiatus that lasted until 1920.

External links
 
 

07
Grey
Grey Cup, 7th
1915 in Ontario
November 1915 sports events
1910s in Toronto